The sensation novel, also sensation fiction, was a literary genre of fiction that achieved peak popularity in Great Britain in the 1860s and 1870s. Its literary forebears included the melodramatic novels and the Newgate novels, which focused on tales woven around criminal biographies; it also drew on the Gothic, romance, as well as mass market genres. The genre's popularity was conjoined to an expanding book market and growth of a reading public, by-products of the Industrial Revolution. Whereas romance and realism had traditionally been contradictory modes of literature, they were brought together in sensation fiction. The sensation novelists commonly wrote stories that were allegorical and abstract; the abstract nature of the stories gave the authors room to explore scenarios that wrestled with the social anxieties of the Victorian era. The loss of identity is seen in many sensation fiction stories because this was a common social anxiety; in Britain, there was an increased use in record keeping and therefore people questioned the meaning and permanence of identity. The social anxiety regarding identity is reflected in novels such as The Woman in White and Lady Audley's Secret.

Sensation fiction is commonly seen to have emerged as a definable genre in the wake of three novels: Wilkie Collins's The Woman in White (1859–60); Ellen (Mrs. Henry) Wood's East Lynne (1861); and Mary Elizabeth Braddon's Lady Audley's Secret (1862). Perhaps the earliest use of the term "sensation fiction" as a name for such novels appears in the 1861 edition of the Saunders, Otley, & co.'s Literary Budget.

Neo-Victorian novels, such as Eleanor Catton's The Luminaries, have been seen to draw on the conventions of sensation fiction. The cited example uses of "suspect wills and forged documents, secret marriages, illegitimacy and opium".

Definition

The Victorian sensation novel has been variously defined as a "novel-with-a-secret" and as the sort of novel that combines "romance and realism" in a way that "strains both modes to the limit".

Influences

Sensation novelists drew on the influences of melodrama, Gothicism, and the Newgate novel to explore themes considered provocative by societal norms and to question the artificiality of identity. In the 1860s, the sensation novels and theatre became closely intertwined; many of the famous sensation novelists wrote as well for the stage. Dickens, Reade, and Collins all wrote and acted for the theatre, and the stage helped many novelists gain recognition as authors. Peter Brooks defines melodrama as an attempt "to find, to articulate, to demonstrate, to 'prove' the existence of a moral universe which, though put into question, masked by villainy and perversions of judgement, does exist and can be made to assert its presence.

The Gothic influence on the sensation novel is described by Laurence Talairach-Vielmas thus:secrecy and the body go hand in hand, and the more sensation novels highlight the elusiveness or artificiality of human identity, the more hair-raising Gothic loci appear as the ultimate place where fragment of truth can be recollected and reunited and story rewritten.A common Gothic influence seen in the sensation novels is the search for a secret. Moreover, crime scenes at wells or near water are symbolic of the "depth" which is a key element of Gothic fiction. The sensation novel puts a modern spin on the classic Gothic ghost stories by placing the stories in contemporary settings and this produces the effect of creating a terror that is real and believable. Le Fanu's story, "Green Tea", is exemplary of the sensation novelists desire to explore the path less trodden. The main character, Jennings, inadvertently opens up an inner eye that can see the spiritual world after consuming too much green tea.

Sensation novels drew influence as well from the Newgate novels that were popular during the 1830s and 40s; similarly to the sensation novel, Newgate novels created much controversy and debate. Authors of both genres found inspiration in newspaper police reports; the crime mysteries of the sensation novels, however, were less interested in actually catching the criminal and instead focused more on the criminal's identity and how they became a criminal.

Themes and reception
Typically the sensation novel focused on shocking subject matter including adultery, theft, kidnapping, insanity, bigamy, forgery, seduction and murder. It distinguished itself from other contemporary genres, including the Gothic novel, by setting these themes in ordinary, familiar and often domestic settings, thereby undermining the common Victorian-era assumption that sensational events were something foreign and divorced from comfortable middle-class life.  W. S. Gilbert satirised these works in his 1871 comic opera A Sensation Novel. For Anthony Trollope, however, the best novels should be "at the same time realistic and sensational...and both in the highest degree".

When sensation novels burst upon a quiescent England these novels became immediate best sellers, surpassing all previous book sales records. However, highbrow critics writing in academic journals of the day decried the phenomenon and criticized its practitioners (and readers) in the harshest terms; John Ruskin perhaps providing the most thoughtful criticism in his 'Fiction – Fair and Foul'.  Some scholars speculate that the notoriety of the genre may have contributed to its popularity. Henry Longueville Mansel from the Quarterly described the sensation novel as "extremely provocative of that sensation in the palate and throat which is a premonitory symptom of nausea".

Notable examples

Legacy
Award-winning writer Sarah Waters stated that her third, critically acclaimed novel Fingersmith (Virago Press, 2002) is meant as a tribute to the sensational novel genre.

See also

Victorian literature
Yellow-back

References

Further reading

External links
 Sensation, BBC Radio 4 discussion with John Mullan, Lyn Pykett & Dinah Birch (In Our Time, Nov. 6, 2003)

 
1860s neologisms
Literary genres